John Adrian McArthur (5 May 1891 – 7 July 1962) was an Australian rules footballer who played with Fitzroy in the Victorian Football League (VFL).

Notes

External links 

1891 births
1962 deaths
Australian rules footballers from Victoria (Australia)
Fitzroy Football Club players
People from Mornington, Victoria